Ridvan Qazimi (4 April 1964 – 24 May 2001), known by the nom de guerre Lleshi, was one of the commanders of the Albanian militant group called the Liberation Army of Preševo, Medveđa and Bujanovac (UÇPMB) which was proclaimed a terrorist organization by Serbia. During the Insurgency in the Preševo Valley, he was one of the four commanders of the UÇPMB and commanded the 112th Brigade.

Biography 
Rizvan Qazimi was born on 4 April 1964 in Bujanovac.

He graduated from the mechanical engineering school in Pristina, but he worked as a tailor and was the owner of a boutique in Bujanovac. He took part in the Croatian and Bosnian War fighting against the Serbs, and he also fought in the ranks of the Kosovo Liberation Army during the Kosovo War, where he was under the command of Adem Jashari, whose image he kept in his headquarters in Konculj.

Along with Shefket Musliu, Muhamed Xhemajli and Mustafa Shaqiri, he commanded the UÇPMB during the Insurgency in the Preševo Valley from 1999 to 2001. He was the head of the negotiating delegation of the UÇPMB in all peace talks talks. He was one of the UCPMB commanders who advocated negotiations and a peaceful way of solving problems.

He was known among his soldiers as Commander Lleshi. He was in charge of the UCPMB Center Sector, which included the villages of Breznica, Mali and Veliki Trnovac, Dobrosin, Konculj and Lučane. The command of his sector was in the village of Veliki Trnovac. He commanded a group of 600 to 700 soldier (112th Brigade) that carried out the most attacks during the conflict in southern Serbia. Towards the end of the conflict, he announced that he would be the last to lay down his weapon, but that he would still lay it down. He then warned that the UCPMB would fiercely respond to any provocation by Serbian forces when entering the Ground Security Zone, an area that Serbian forces were prohibited from entering after the Kumanovo Agreement.

Death 
As part of the plan for the return of the Yugoslav Army to the Ground Security Zone, UCPMB commanders Shefket Musliu, Muhamed Xhemajli, Ridvan Qazimi and Mustafa Shaqiri signed an agreement on the peaceful demobilization of UCPMB in Konculj on 21 May, in the presence of Sean Sullivan, head of the NATO Office for Yugoslavia. According to that agreement, the Yugoslav Army was to enter Sector B of the Ground Security Zone by 31 May 2001.

Qazimi was killed only three days later, on 24 May 2001, during a conflict between the UCPMB and the Yugoslav forces near Veliki Trnovac, which lasted from 11:30 a.m. to 3:00 p.m. He was killed by a sniper. The journalists were told that day in the Press Center of the Coordination Body for the municipalities of Bujanovac, Preševo and Medveđa that it was, in fact, an accident and that Qazimi and other members of UCPMB were shot because, according to an earlier agreement, they were not supposed to be there while the Yugoslav Forces were entering the Ground Security Zone. The then president of the Coordination Body, Nebojsa Čović, expressed regret over this event, which he repeated several times later.

Legacy 
After the conflict, at the entrance to Veliki Trnovac, local Albanians erected a monument to him in 2002. He is highly respected by Albanians in southern Serbia, and a four-day manifestation, "Commander Lleshi"s Days", is held in his honor every year. He also got his own museum, which opened on 26 November 2012 in Veliki Trnovac. It was built by local Albanians with the help of the Albanian diaspora. It exhibits Captain Leshi's personal belongings - photographs, uniform, weapons as well as the jeep in which he was killed.

References 

1964 births
People from Bujanovac
2001 deaths
Albanian nationalists in Kosovo
Deaths by firearm in Serbia
Guerrillas killed in action
Kosovan revolutionaries
Kosovan independence activists